Lurio is a spider genus of the jumping spider family, Salticidae.

Species
 Lurio conspicuus Mello-Leitão, 1930 – Brazil
 Lurio crassichelis Berland, 1913 – Ecuador
 Lurio lethierryi (Taczanowski, 1872) – French Guiana
 Lurio solennis (C. L. Koch, 1846) – Colombia, Venezuela, French Guiana
 Lurio splendidissimus Caporiacco, 1954 – French Guiana

External links
 Picture of Lurio sp.

Salticidae
Spiders of South America
Salticidae genera